Group A of the 1996 Fed Cup Asia/Oceania Zone Group I was one of two pools in the Asia/Oceania Zone Group I of the 1996 Fed Cup. Four teams competed in a round robin competition, with the top two teams advancing to the knockout stage and the bottom team being relegated down to Group II for 1997.

China vs. Philippines

Thailand vs. Kazakhstan

China vs. Kazakhstan

China vs. Thailand

Thailand vs. Philippines

Kazakhstan vs. Philippines

  placed last in the pool, and thus was relegated to Group II in 1997, where they achieved advancement back into Group I for 1998.

See also
Fed Cup structure

References

External links
 Fed Cup website

1996 Fed Cup Asia/Oceania Zone